Campnosperma squamatum is a tree in the cashew and sumac family Anacardiaceae. The specific epithet  is from the Latin meaning "scaly", referring to the leaf surface.

Description
Its yellowish-grey bark is smooth to scaly. The flowers are greenish yellow. The tree is a food source for gibbons in Sabangau National Park in Kalimantan.

Distribution and habitat
Campnosperma squamatum grows naturally in Peninsular Malaysia and Borneo. Its habitat is in lowland areas: in swamps, kerangas forests and hill forests up to  altitude.

References

squamatum
Trees of Borneo
Trees of Peninsular Malaysia
Flora of Singapore
Plants described in 1933